Đorđe Tutorić (Serbian Cyrillic: Ђорђе Туторић; born 5 March 1983) is a Serbian retired footballer.

Club career
Born in Subotica, Tutorić began his career in his native Serbia playing for Red Star Belgrade. From 2002 to 2005, he was loaned to FK Jedinstvo Ub and in the 2005–06 season to FK Mladost Apatin. In late 2008, Tutorić moved to Kocaelispor in the Turkish Süper Lig. In 2009, he returned to Red Star Belgrade and played one season before he moved to Ferencváros TC playing in the Hungarian professional league. In 2012, he joined FK Novi Pazar in the Serbian SuperLiga.

International career
Tutorić made his debut for the full Serbia national football team in a Euro 2008 Group A qualifier at home against Kazakhstan on 24 November 2007.

References

External links

 
 Guardian's Stats Centre
 
 
 Đorđe Tutorić at Utakmica.rs 

1983 births
Living people
Sportspeople from Subotica
Serbian footballers
Association football defenders
Serbia international footballers
Red Star Belgrade footballers
FK Jedinstvo Ub players
FK Mladost Apatin players
Kocaelispor footballers
Ferencvárosi TC footballers
FK Novi Pazar players
FC Atyrau players
A.E. Ermionida F.C. players
Serbian SuperLiga players
Nemzeti Bajnokság I players
Süper Lig players
Kazakhstan Premier League players
Serbian expatriate footballers
Expatriate footballers in Turkey
Expatriate footballers in Hungary
Expatriate footballers in Kazakhstan
Expatriate footballers in Greece
Serbian expatriate sportspeople in Turkey
Serbian expatriate sportspeople in Hungary
Serbian expatriate sportspeople in Kazakhstan
Serbian expatriate sportspeople in Greece